The 2009–10 Copa Federación de España was the 17th staging of the Copa Federación de España, a knockout competition for Spanish football clubs in Segunda División B and Tercera División.

The competition began on 1 August 2009 and ended with the finals on 24 March and 7 April 2010, where San Roque became champion after defeating Lorca Deportiva 3–0 on aggregate.

Autonomous Communities tournaments

Aragon tournament

Quarter-finals

Semifinals

Final

Asturias tournament

Qualifying tournament

Group A

Group B

Group C

Group D

Semifinals

Final

Balearic Islands tournament

Semifinals

Final

Canary Islands tournament

First round

Semifinal

Final

Cantabria tournament

Quarter-finals

Semifinals

Final

Castile-La Mancha tournament

Semifinals

Final

Catalonia tournament

Final

Euskadi tournament

Final

Extremadura tournament

First round

Second round

Semifinal

Final

Galicia tournament

Qualifying round

Semifinal

Final

La Rioja tournament

Qualifying round

Semifinals

Final

Madrid tournament

Qualifying tournament

Group 1

Group 2

Final

Murcia tournament

Quarter-finals

Semifinals

Final

Navarre tournament

Final

Valencia tournament

Semifinals

Final

National tournament

National Qualifying round

Round of 32

Round of 16

Quarterfinals

Semifinals

Final

References

Copa Federación de España seasons
Fed
Copa
Copa